Henry John Dobson ARCA RSW (1858–1928) was a 19th/20th century Scottish artist. He is best remembered for his 1893 portrait of Keir Hardie.

Life

He was born in St John's Town of Dalry in 1858, the son of Thomas Dobson, a wool merchant. He maintained a studio in St John's Town of Dalry which still exists and is now the public library.

He trained at the School of Design and Royal Institution in Edinburgh.

In the 1890s he was living in Bradford.

In 1911 he had studios at 108 George Street in Edinburgh's First New Town and lived at 12 Leven Terrace in the Bruntsfield district.

He died on 5 July 1928 and is buried in Liberton Cemetery. The grave lies against the east wall of the north cemetery, midway along its length.

Known works
Old Lady Spinning - Stranraer Museum
The Light of Home - Stewartry Museum
The Crofter's Grace (1894)
George Hamilton (1855–1835) - Glasgow Museums Resource Centre
Mrs Hamilton (1899)
Keir Hardie - Scottish National Portrait Gallery
Keir Hardie in 1892 - Parliamentary Art Collection
Granny's Blessing - Bradford Industrial Museum
Mending the Bird's Cage (1907)
Dr Livingstone Teaching the Natives
Burns'  Grace
The Rt Hon Edward Herbert, 3rd Earl of Powis
A Scottish Sacrament
Cottage Interior with a Young Girl
Burns' Wooing
Busy Guidwife
Mother Hen
The Evening Chapter
John Anderson My Jo
Fireside Crack
Granddad's Favourite
The Evening Lesson
Peeling Tatties

Artistic recognition

His full length portrait by his son, Cowan Dobson (1898–1980), is held by the Scottish National Portrait Gallery.

Family

He was married to Jeannie Charlotte Hannah Cowan (died 1953).

Their children included Henry Raeburn Dobson (in obvious homage to the artist Henry Raeburn) and David Cowan Dobson.

References

1858 births
1928 deaths
Scottish artists